Heamatangi Tu'ivai (born 11 November 1989) is a Tongan Athlete and rugby player who has represented Tonga at the Commonwealth Games and Pacific Mini Games.

Early life and career 
Tu'ivai is from Hihifo in Haʻapai. 

At the 2009 Pacific Mini Games in Rarotonga in won silver in the 400 metres hurdles. At the 2013 Pacific Mini Games in Mata Utu, Wallis and Futuna he won silver in the 400 meters and the 400 meters hurdles, and bronze as part of the 4 × 100 metres relay team. He competed in the 400 meters at the 2014 Commonwealth Games in Glasgow, coming 7th in his heat. At the 2013 Oceania Athletics Championships he won gold as part of the 4 × 100 metres relay team. At the 2014 Oceania Athletics Championships he won bronze as part of the 4 × 100 metres relay team. At the 2017 Oceania Athletics Championships he won bronze as part of the Tongan 4 × 400 metres relay team.

Tu'ivai has also represented Tonga at rugby, as part of the Tonga A national rugby union team at the 2017 World Rugby Americas Pacific Challenge.

References

Living people
1989 births
Tongan male sprinters
Tongan hurdlers
People from Haʻapai
20th-century Tongan people
21st-century Tongan people